Arthur Villanueva (born January 20, 1989) is a Filipino professional boxer. He is currently under the Bantamweight division.

Early life
Villanueva is the second youngest of 12 children in their family. His father died when he was 15, leaving his mother to raise the family. To help his mother, he started driving a tricycle, making him to earn as much as 100 pesos ($2.50 USD) a day. Despite of these hardships, he was able to finish high school and immediately proceeded to college with AB Mathematics course.

King as often called by his friends, is also an avid chess player. He earned 4 medals competing inner-city chess tournaments during his elementary and high school years. According to him, one of his greatest achievement, was coming in 2nd place in a tournament in 2004 against the best players in their hometown.

The young Villanueva started boxing at the age of 16, losing only 7 out of his 50 amateur fights. He turned professional at age of 19.

Professional career
Villanueva made his professional debut on November 29, 2008, at the age of 19, defeating fellow debutant Alan Magno via TKO in the second round at 
PAGCOR Hotel and Casino, Goldenfield Commercial Complex, Bacolod, Negros Occidental, Philippines.

On August 1, 2010, Villanueva won the vacant Philippines Games and Amusement Board (GAB) flyweight title via TKO in the 7th round against Brix Ray.

On December 19, 2012, "King" Arthur Villanueva won the vacant Oriental and Pacific Boxing Federation (OPBF) super flyweight title via unanimous decision against the Japanese Taiki Eto in a fight held at Korakuen Hall, Bunkyo, Tokyo.

On July 13, 2013, Villanueva captured the vacant WBO Asia Pacific super flyweight title by defeating a Mexican fighter Arturo “Fuerte” Badillo via TKO on the 4th round.

On October 26, 2013, at the Pinoy Pride XXII, Villanueva won the vacant WBO International super flyweight title after his devastation of Mexico's Edgar Martinez of whom he dropped twice on the very first round.

During the Pinoy Pride XXVII held at Dubai World Trade Centre, Dubai, United Arab Emirates, Arthur Villanueva gained the IBF International Jr Bantamweight title by stopping Henry 'El Crespo' Maldonado of Nicaragua via split decision, scoring 117-110 and 116-113 from two judges.

On July 19, 2015, "King" lost via controversial technical decision on former olympian Mcjoe Arroyo for the vacant world title. On November 28, 2015, Villanueva claimed the new WBC International Super Flyweight belt after he won their fight against Mexican Victor "Spock" Mendez via split decision in the main fight of Pinoy Pride 34 held at Hoops Dome, Lapu-Lapu City.

Professional boxing record

{|class="wikitable" style="text-align:center; font-size:95%"
|-
!Result
!Record
!Opponent
!Type
!Round, time
!Date
!Location
!Notes

|- align=center
|Loss
|32-4-0
|align=left| Nordine Oubaali
|
|
|
|align=left|
|
|- align=center
|Win
|32-3-0
|align=left| Renren Tesorio
|
|
|
|align=left|
|
|- align=center
|Loss
|31-3-0
|align=left| Luis Nery
|
|
|
|align=left|
|
|- align=center
|Win
|31-2-0
|align=left| Richie Mepranum
|RTD
|
|
|align=left|
|
|- align=center
|Loss
|30-2-0
|align=left| Zolani Tete
|UD
|
|
|align=left|
|align=left|
|- align=center
|Win
|30-1-0
|align=left| Juan Jimenez
|
|
|
|align=left|
|align=left|
|- align=center
|Win
|29-1-0
|align=left| Juan Jimenez
|
|
|
|align=left|
|align=left|
|- align=center
|Win
|28-1-0
|align=left| Victor Mendez
|
|
|
|align=left|
|align=left|.
|- align=center
|Loss
|27-1-0
|align=left| McJoe Arroyo
|
|
|
|align=left|
|align=left|
|- align=center
|Win
|27-0-0
|align=left| Julio César Miranda
|
|
|
|align=left|
|align=left|
|- align=center
|Win
|26-0-0
|align=left| Henry Maldonado
|
|
|
|align=left|
|align=left|
|- align=center
|Win
|25-0-0
|align=left| Fernando Aguilar
|
|
|
|align=left|
|align=left|
|- align=center
|Win
|24-0-0
|align=left| Edgar Martinez
|
|
|
|align=left|
|align=left|
|- align=center
|Win
|23-0-0
|align=left| Arturo Badillo
|
|
|
|align=left|
|align=left|.
|- align=center
|Win
|22-0-0
|align=left| Marco Demecillo
|
|
|
|align=left|
|align=left|
|- align=center
|Win
|21-0-0
|align=left| Taiki Eto
|
|
|
|align=left|
|align=left|
|- align=center
|Win
|20-0-0
|align=left| Pramuansak Posuwan
|
|
|
|align=left|
|align=left|
|- align=center
|Win
|19-0-0
|align=left| Jeffrey Cerna
|
|
|
|align=left|
|align=left|
|- align=center
|Win
|18-0-0
|align=left| Rey Megrino
|
|
|
|align=left|
|align=left|
|- align=center
|Win
|17-0-0
|align=left| Rosel Alim
|
|
|
|align=left|
|align=left|
|- align=center
|Win
|16-0-0
|align=left| Mark Anthony Geraldo
|
|
|
|align=left|
|align=left|
|- align=center
|Win
|15-0-0
|align=left| Samuel Apuya
|
|
|
|align=left|
|align=left|
|- align=center
|Win
|14-0-0
|align=left| Nicardo Calamba
|
|
|
|align=left|
|align=left|
|- align=center
|Win
|13-0-0
|align=left| Brix Ray
|
|
|
|align=left|
|align=left|
|- align=center
|Win
|12-0-0
|align=left| Nicardo Calamba
|
|
|
|align=left|
|align=left|
|- align=center
|Win
|11-0-0
|align=left| Daryl Amoncio
|
|
|
|align=left|
|align=left|
|- align=center
|Win
|10-0-0
|align=left| Sherwin Manatad
|
|
|
|align=left|
|align=left|
|- align=center
|Win
|9-0-0
|align=left| Jojo Bardon
|
|
|
|align=left|
|align=left|
|- align=center
|Win
|8-0-0
|align=left| Daryl Amoncio
|
|
|
|align=left|
|align=left|
|- align=center
|Win
|7-0-0
|align=left| Fabio Marfa
|
|
|
|align=left|
|align=left|
|- align=center
|Win
|6-0-0
|align=left| Geboi Mansalayao
|
|
|
|align=left|
|align=left|
|- align=center
|Win
|5-0-0
|align=left| Mark Saloma
|
|
|
|align=left|
|align=left|
|- align=center
|Win
|4-0-0
|align=left| Edcel Tunacao
|
|
|
|align=left|
|align=left|
|- align=center
|Win
|3-0-0
|align=left| Albert Villacampa
|
|
|
|align=left|
|align=left|
|- align=center
|Win
|2-0-0
|align=left| PJ Arong
|
|
|
|align=left|
|align=left|
|- align=center
|Win
|1-0-0
|align=left| Alan Magno
|
|
|
|align=left|
|align=left|

Regional and Minor Titles
WBO Asia Pacific Bantamweight Title (May 2016)
WBC International Super Flyweight Title (November 2015)
IBF International Super Flyweight Title (September 2014)
WBO International Super Flyweight Title (October 2013)
WBO Asia Pacific Super Flyweight Title (July 2013)
OPBF Super Flyweight Title (December 2012)
Philippines Games and Amusement Board (GAB) Flyweight Title (August 2010)

References

External links 
 

1989 births
Living people
Flyweight boxers
Boxers from Negros Occidental
Filipino male boxers